Slam are a Scottish producer/DJ duo from Glasgow, Scotland, consisting of Stuart McMillan (born 1966, Glasgow) and Orde Meikle (born 1964, Oxford). They are co-founders of Soma Quality Recordings. Their music style consists of house and techno.

History
McMillan and Meikle's first club event was a weekly Thursday night called Black Market, in the Glasgow club, Fury Murrys. They played a mix of house, funk and rap. In early 1988, they were approached by Steven Sleepman (aka Steven Workman), after he heard his first acid house track on DJ Segun's late night show on Radio Clyde. During a brief stint PRing for Club Eden, Sleepman secured a Saturday night at Glasgow's Tin Pan Alley, which was to become the home of Slam. Dave Clarke, an original founding partner of Black Market ran PR with Sleepman. Prior to the launch of her musical career Dot Allison (a future musical collaborator) worked with the PR team, and DJ Harri was a regular guest on the turntables.

Slam then launched a Friday night at the Sub Club called Joy. Black Market still kept its own musical identity throughout the Second Summer of Love, playing an eclectic mix of musical genres.

Shortly after, Tennent's Lager’s marketing agency approached Slam with a sponsorship deal to tour Scotland's clubs over a period of two years. The tour ultimately led to Slam's residency at T in the Park and increased their nationwide profile.

Slam have released singles since the mid-1990s, including "Positive Education", "Eterna" and "Lifetimes". They co-founded Soma Quality Recordings in 1991, along with label boss Dave Clarke. More recently, Slam Events was launched - a subdivision of Soma that deals mainly with the promotion of Slam and Slam nights. Slam were the resident DJs at Pressure, a monthly event promoted by Soma and Slam Events which occurred on the last Friday of every month at The Arches in Glasgow, which was later relocated to SWG3 and rebranded as Maximum Pressure after The Arches nightclub was closed in 2015. They also have a residency at the Sub Club in Glasgow at another Soma and Slam Events night called Return to Mono. They have also been resident DJs at Fabric in London. Over recent years Slam have curated and played in the Slam Tent, at T in the Park, and they have appeared on BBC Radio 1's "Essential Mix" six times between 1994 and 2008, as well as appearing at Bestival in 2008.

Discography
Snapshots (Soma, 1995)
"Positive Education" (Remixes)" (2x12") (Soma, 1995) - UK No. 44 (2001)
Headstates (Soma, 1996)
"Past Lessons" / "Future Theories" (Distinctive Breaks, 2000)
Alien Radio (Soma, 2001)
Alien Radio Remixed (Soma, 2002)
Slam in America (DMC, 2002)
Fabric 09: Slam (Fabric, 2003)
Year Zero (Soma, 2004)
Nightdrive (Resist, 2005)
Ekspozicija 4 (Explicit Musick, 2006)
Human Response (Soma, 2007)
 "Maffaking" / "Last Sonic Approach" (single) (Drumcode Records, 2010)
 "Cacophony" (single) (Drumcode Records, 2010)
 "Crowded Room" (single) (Drumcode Records, 2011)
 "Area 51" (single) (Drumcode Records, 2011)
 "Vespula" (single) (Drumcode Records, 2012)
 "Movement" (single) (Drumcode Records, 2013)
 "Astrolabe" (single) (Soma Records, 2013)
 Machine Cut Noise  (album) (Soma Records, 2016)

Remixes
 "Drive" — Daft Punk
 "Burnin'" — Daft Punk
 "Chronologie 6" — Jean-Michel Jarre
 "Close Your Eyes" — Dot Allison
 "Mothership Reconnection (Star Child)"  —  Parliament

References

External links

Soma Records profile
Slam Events
[ AllMusic profile]

Scottish electronic music groups
DJ duos
British house music groups
British techno music groups
Scottish DJs
Remixers
Electronic dance music duos